Philip Fasano was an executive vice president and the chief information officer at American International Group (AIG). Formerly he served as executive vice president and chief information officer at Kaiser Permanente. In addition, Fasano also served in IT leadership roles at Capital One Financial, JP Morgan Chase, and Deutsche Financial Services, among others. In 2017, Fasano was inducted into the CIO Hall of Fame, a special career recognition bestowed by CIO Magazine, the executive-level tech media brand providing insight into business technology leadership, as a CIO whose outstanding work has shown both creative vision and practical leadership in information technology. While Fasano served as an executive vice president and chief information officer at Kaiser Permanente, he was also honored as Health Information Technology Man of the Year as part of Healthcare IT News’ second annual Health IT Men and Women Awards. He is the author of Transforming Health Care: The Financial Impact of Technology, Electronic Tools and Data Mining. Fasano currently serves on the board of trustees at the New York Institute of Technology. He graduated with a BS degree in computer science from New York Institute of Technology.

References

New York Institute of Technology alumni
Living people
Year of birth missing (living people)